Larry Ryan Jensen (born September 17, 1975) is an American former professional baseball pitcher. He played in Major League Baseball (MLB) for the San Francisco Giants and Kansas City Royals. He won 13 games in 2002 for the Giants.

Career
Jensen was born in Salt Lake City, Utah. He attended Southern Utah University and then signed his first professional baseball contract with the Giants in June 1996.

Jensen pitched for various minor league teams over the next five years, including the Pacific Coast League's Fresno Grizzlies from 1998–2001. In 2001, he went 11–2 with a 3.48 earned run average. Jensen made the San Francisco starting rotation in 2002 and went 13–8 in 171.2 innings. It was his only full major league season.

In 2003, Jensen started off slow and was sent back down to Fresno, where he went 1-10. In November 2004, he signed with the Kansas City Royals. He made 18 starts for the Omaha Royals in 2005; he went 2–11 with a 7.20 ERA before being released.

Jensen also signed with the Baltimore Orioles and Texas Rangers. His baseball career ended in 2006.

References

External links

1975 births
Living people
Major League Baseball pitchers
San Francisco Giants players
Kansas City Royals players
Bellingham Giants players
Salem-Keizer Volcanoes players
Bakersfield Blaze players
Fresno Grizzlies players
Omaha Royals players
Long Island Ducks players
Arizona League Rangers players
Frisco RoughRiders players
Southern Utah Thunderbirds baseball players
Baseball players from Salt Lake City